Indian coolie-loach (Pangio goaensis') is a species of ray-finned fish in the genus Pangio''.

Footnotes 

 

Pangio
Fish described in 1972